Organic pollution may refer to:
concentration of organic compounds in water including:
dissolved and suspended biogenic substances from aquatic and terrestrial species
persistent organic pollutants
nutrients from fertilizers or other sources of soluble nitrogen or phosphorus
air pollution through volatile organic compounds